This is the discography of the Dutch record producer and DJ Fedde Le Grand.

Albums

Studio albums

Singles

As lead artist

Non-charted singles

Free tracks
 2012: Freaky (with Nicky Romero)
 2012: Slacking (with Nicky Romero feat. MC Gee)
 2018: The Gaming Beat (feat. Kris Kiss)
 2018: You Lift Me Up
 2018: Scream Out Loud

Remixes

 2004: Anita Kelsey - "Every Kiss" 
 2005: Funkerman and Raf - "Rule The Night"
 2005: Erick E - "Boogie Down"
 2005: Funkerman - "The One" 
 2006: Camille Jones - "The Creeps" 
 2006: Erick E Feat. Gina J - "Boogie Down"
 2006: Freeform Five - "No More Conversations" 
 2006: Olav Basoski Feat. Mc Spyder - "Like Dis" 
 2006: Erick E - "The Beat Is Rockin'"
 2006: Sharam - "Party All The Time" (Fedde Le Grand Remix)
 2007: Ida Corr - "Let Me Think About It"
 2007: The Factory - "Couldn't Love You More" (Fedde Le Grand Remix) 
 2007: Robbie Williams - "King Of Bongo" 
 2007: Samim - "Heater" 
 2008: Martin Solveig - "C'est La Vie" (Fedde vs. Martin Club Mix)
 2008: Madonna - "Give It 2 Me"
 2008: Stereo MCs - "Black Gold"
 2010: Benny Benassi featuring Kelis, apl.de.ap, and Jean Baptiste - "Spaceship"
 2010: Everything But The Girl - "Missing"
 2011: David Guetta featuring Taio Cruz and Ludacris - "Little Bad Girl" (Fedde Le Grand Remix)
 2011: Coldplay - "Paradise" (Fedde Le Grand Remix)
Rage Against The Machine - "Killing In the Name" (Fedde Le Grand Remix)
 2012: Digitalism - "Zdarlight" (Fedde Le Grand and Deniz Koyu Remix)
 2013: Timeflies - "I Choose U" (Fedde Le Grand Remix)
 2013: Nikki Williams - "Glowing" (Fedde Le Grand Remix)
 2014: Shakira featuring Rihanna - "Can't Remember To Forget You" (Fedde Le Grand Remix)
 2014: Mariah Carey - "You're Mine" (Fedde Le Grand Remix)
 2014: Michael Jackson - "Love Never Felt So Good" (Fedde Le Grand Remix)
 2014: Mary Lambert - "Secrets" (Fedde Le Grand Remix)
 2014: Naughty Boy featuring Sam Romans - "Home" (Fedde Le Grand Remix)
 2014: Nicky Romero and Vicetone - "Let Me Feel" (Fedde Le Grand Remix)
 2015: Madonna - "Bitch I'm Madonna" (Fedde Le Grand Remix)
 2015: Faithless - "Insomnia" (Fedde Le Grand Remix)
 2018: The Chainsmokers - "Side Effects" (Fedde Le Grand Remix)
 2019: Loud Luxury and Anders - "Love No More" (Fedde Le Grand Remix)
 2019: Matoma featuring MNEK and Kiana Ledé - "Bruised Not Broken" (Fedde Le Grand Remix)
 2019: Charlie Puth - "Mother" (Fedde Le Grand Remix)
 2020: Josh Cumbee - "Worth Missing" (Fedde Le Grand Remix)
 2021: Sigala and Rita Ora - "You for Me" (Fedde Le Grand Remix)

References

 

Discographies of Dutch artists
Electronic music discographies
House music discographies